Bangor City F.C. is a Welsh football club based in Bangor, Gwynedd, who currently play in the Cymru North, the second tier of organised football in Wales. City's first participation in European competition was during the 1962–63 season, when they competed in the European Cup Winners' Cup after winning the Welsh Cup. The club's first match was against Napoli of the Italian Serie A. Bangor did not compete again in Europe for 23 years until the 1985–86 season when they once again played in the European Cup Winners' Cup. City did not see regular European action until the formation of the League of Wales (now Welsh Premier League) in 1992.

To meet UEFA regulations, Bangor have played some home European games at Belle Vue in Rhyl and the Racecourse Ground in Wrexham.

Matches

1962–63 UEFA Cup Winners' Cup

1985–86 UEFA Cup Winners' Cup

1994–95 UEFA Cup

1995–96 UEFA Cup

1998–99 UEFA Cup Winners' Cup

2000–01 UEFA Cup

2002–03 UEFA Cup

2003 UEFA Intertoto Cup

2005 UEFA Intertoto Cup

2008–09 UEFA Cup

2009–10 UEFA Europa League

2010–11 UEFA Europa League

2011–12 UEFA Europa League

2012–13 UEFA Europa League

Statistics

Record by season

Key

P = Played
W = Games won
D = Games drawn
L = Games lost
F = Goals for
A = Goals against

PR = Preliminary round
R1 = First round
R2 = Second round

Record by competition
Correct as of the end of the 2010–11 UEFA Europa League campaign.

Record by country

References

Bibliography

External links
rsssf.com
welsh-premier.com - All-time Welsh Premier European results

Europe
Welsh football clubs in international competitions